Echis carinatus sinhaleyus is a venomous viper subspecies endemic to Sri Lanka.

Common names
Sri Lankan saw-scaled viper.

The vernacular name  translates as "sand viper".

Geographic range
It is found in Sri Lanka.

The type locality is described as "Chavakachcheri, Jaffna Peninsula" (Northern Province, Sri Lanka).

References

Further reading
 Deraniyagala PEP. 1951. Some New Races of the Snakes Eryx, Callophis [sic] and Echis. Spolia Zeylanica 26 (2): 147-150. ("Echis carinatus sinhaleyus ssp. nov.", pp. 148-149, Tables III-IV).
 Golay P, Smith HM, Broadley DG, Dixon JR, McCarthy CJ, Rage J-C, Schätti B, Toriba M. 1993. Endoglyphs and Other Major Venomous Snakes of the World. A Checklist. Geneva: Azemiops. 478 pp.

External links
 
 

Viperinae
Reptiles of Sri Lanka
Endemic fauna of Sri Lanka